Keith Millar Hardie (born 13 May 1947) is a Scottish first-class cricketer.

The son of John Millar Hardie, he was born in May 1974 at Larbert, Stirlingshire. He was educated there at Larbert High School. A club cricketer for Stenhousemuir Cricket Club, Hardie made his debut for Scotland in first-class cricket against Ireland at Edinburgh in 1966. He played first-class cricket for Scotland until 1976, making ten appearances. Playing as an all-rounder in the Scottish side, Hardie scored 158 runs at an average of 22.57; he made one half century, a score of 65 not out against Ireland in his final first-class match. As a slow left-arm orthodox bowler, he took 35 wickets at a bowling average of 17.88, with best figures of 4 for 23. His brother, Brian, had a lengthy career in county cricket with Essex.

References

External links
 

1947 births
Living people
People from Larbert
People educated at Larbert High School
Scottish cricketers